Christopher W. Lawson (born November 6, 1985) is an American professional stock car racing crew chief who works for Front Row Motorsports as the crew chief for Zane Smith's No. 38 Ford F-150 in the NASCAR Craftsman Truck Series. He previously worked with Todd Gilliland in the NASCAR West Series for Bill McAnally Racing, where the duo won two consecutive championships in 2016 and 2017 and twelve races together. Prior to becoming a crew chief, Lawson was a driver for underfunded, start and park teams in NASCAR and ARCA until 2011.

Racing career

Driving career
Lawson gained notoriety in 2011 as the driver who replaced Jennifer Jo Cobb at Bristol Motor Speedway in the 2nd Chance Motorsports No. 79 entry after Cobb left the team on the day of the race after a dispute with team owner Rick Russell on being told to start and park in that race. Rookie of the year contender Charles Lewandoski was initially set to be the team's substitute driver, but was unable to get prepared in the car in time for the start of the race, so Russell then got Lawson to jump in Cobb's car and start and park it. Lawson had failed to qualify for the Bristol race in another start and park entry, the No. 03 for R3 Motorsports. He was the only DNQ for the race, and was still at the track when it was about to start. This race would end up being Lawson's last as a driver.

Crew chiefing career

In 2019, Lawson served as Tanner Gray's crew chief in the ARCA Menards Series for DGR-Crosley.

Motorsports career results

NASCAR
(key) (Bold – Pole position awarded by qualifying time. Italics – Pole position earned by points standings or practice time. * – Most laps led.)

Nationwide Series

Camping World Truck Series

ARCA Racing Series
(key) (Bold – Pole position awarded by qualifying time. Italics – Pole position earned by points standings or practice time. * – Most laps led.)

References

External links
 
 

Living people
1985 births
NASCAR drivers
NASCAR crew chiefs
ARCA Menards Series drivers